De Klomp is a village in the municipality of Ede, with a railway station called "Veenendaal-De Klomp railway station". It is located in the Dutch province of Gelderland.

It was first mentioned in 1787 as De Klomp, and is a name of an inn. A settlement has known to exist since 1565 and mainly concentrated along the road. After World War II, industry started to settle in the village.

Gallery

References 

Ede, Netherlands
Klomp, De